In 1913, Oklahoma was apportioned three additional congressional seats. For just the 63rd United States Congress, those three members represented the state at-large.

In 1933, Oklahoma was apportioned one additional seat. For the  through the  congresses, Will Rogers held the seat at-large. In 1943, the seat was eliminated.

References

 Congressional Biographical Directory of the United States 1774–present

At-large
Former congressional districts of the United States
At-large United States congressional districts